The Saturn Award for Best DVD Television Release is an award presented to the best DVD release of a television series by the Academy of Science Fiction, Fantasy and Horror Films.The following is a list of the winners of this award:

External links
 
 The 35th annual Saturn Awards (2009) (MS-Word) from SaturnAwards.org
 Past Saturn Award — Best DVD television release past years from SaturnAwards.org

Best Television DVD Release